Marquette was an American automobile manufacturer established by General Motors in 1909 after the purchase of the Rainier Motor Car Company. The Marquette Company did not last long and in 1912 GM announced the company would be closed. 

The Marquette brand had been used before by the Berwick Auto Car Company in 1904, and then by the Buick division of GM for a car series released in 1929. The Marquette brand was then discontinued by GM and has not been used since.

History

Company 
The name Marquette was first used for an automobile when the Berwick Auto Car Company of Grand Rapids, Michigan, frequently took it as a model designation for their electric car in 1904.

One of the General Motors founders, William Durant, bought the Rainier Motor Car Company in May 1909. Rainier was in severe financial trouble at the moment of the purchase. Following that, a new company, the Marquette Motor Company was established in Saginaw, Michigan, to continue production of the luxurious 'Rainier' motor car until 1911. They manufactured parts for another luxury make belonging to General Motors, the Welch Motor Car Company (1903–1911), and its lower-priced sister car, the Welch-Detroit (1910–1911). 

Management was controlled by Buick officers. After Durant left GM for the first time in September 1910, it was tried to make both the Rainier and the Welch profitable with the Marquette, a new make was introduced. It produced two car lines, both with huge 4-cylinder engines. The 40 hp line, essentially an improved and elongated Rainier (122 instead of 120 in. wheelbase), was available in four open body styles:

Model 22 2-passenger runabout
Model 24 4-passenger tourabout
Model 25 5-passenger touring
Model 27 7-passenger touring

The chassis had a wheelbase of 122 inches. Each sold for US$3,000. ($ in  dollars )

The 45 hp line consisted of one model only, the Model 28 7-passenger touring. It had a wheelbase of 119 inches, and sold for $4,000. ($ in  dollars 

This reorganization was not successful, as GM announced the end of the Marquette still in 1912. Probably, some of the last Marquettes were labeled as "Peninsular". THe plant then closed in 1913. During World War I, the plant was reopened and used to manufacture mortar shells for the US Ordnance Corps, then was repurposed for engine block casting when operations at Northway Motor and Manufacturing Division ended in 1925. The factory was repurposed as Chevrolet Saginaw Parts Plant which made many different types of parts and closed in 1983 and was demolished in 1984. Located on corner of 6th & Washington Avenues.

Buick brand 

The Marquette nameplate was revived when the Buick division of General Motors launched their junior brand for model year 1930. Along with Viking, LaSalle, and Pontiac, the Marquette was conceived to span a price gap in General Motors' market segmentation plan, and shared the GM B platform with the Buick Standard Six and Buick Master Six. Marquette was placed below Buick, but above Viking which was to be sold in Oldsmobile dealerships. The Marquette arrived in dealer showrooms on June 1, 1929.

The Marquette line rode on an  wheelbase and was powered by an L-head straight six   producing  which was uncharacteristic of Buick products using overhead valves. Marquette was built to sell in the $1,000 range, and was available in a single car range. This Series 30 consisted of six body styles:

Model 30 Two-Door Sedan
Model 34 Sport Roadster
Model 35 Phaeton
Model 36 Business Coupe (2 pass.)
Model 36S Special Coupe (2/4 pass.)
Model 37 Sedan

The Marquette's most distinctive styling feature was its herringbone grille. Reviewers at the time described it either looking like a small Oldsmobile or small Cadillac.

Compared to Oldsmobile's Viking, which enjoyed a total production run of only 7,224 over three model years (1929, 1930, 1931) Marquette produced 35,007 vehicles in the U.S. during its brief one year life span; additionally, GM Canada turned out another 6,535 Marquettes.

Despite its promising first year sales, two factors worked against the Marquette. The first involved Oldsmobile, which lost sales to Marquette; the second was that Buick executives did not feel that enough Marquettes were sold to warrant the extra burden on the bottom line given the state of the economy. Buick gave no advance warning of the termination of the Marquette; just four months before the shutdown, 4,000 Marquette signs were shipped to dealers in the hope of better days ahead. The entry-level position held by Marquette was replaced by the new entry-level Buick Special.

After the shutdown of Marquette, the engine production tools were shipped to Germany, where it was used to power the original Opel Blitz. This was the first link between Opel and Buick, a sporadic tie-up which was to last until General Motors finally severed ties with Opel in the 21st century.

References

External links
 Photo of restored 1930 Model 34 Sport Roadster

Motor vehicle manufacturers based in Michigan
Defunct motor vehicle manufacturers of the United States
General Motors marques
Buick
Defunct brands
Defunct manufacturing companies based in Michigan
Companies based in Flint, Michigan
1909 establishments in Michigan
1930 disestablishments in Michigan
Vehicle manufacturing companies established in 1909
Vehicle manufacturing companies disestablished in 1912
[Category:Vehicle manufacturing companies established in 1929]]
Vehicle manufacturing companies disestablished in 1930
Brass Era vehicles
Vintage vehicles
Pre-war vehicles
1910s cars
1920s cars
1930s cars
Cars introduced in 1909
Cars introduced in 1929